Baselios Thomas I  (born 22 July 1929) is a Syriac Orthodox  Catholicos of India (Maphrian) and head of the Jacobite Syrian Christian Church, the Syriac Orthodox Church in India. He was enthroned on 26 July 2002 by Syriac Orthodox Patriarch Ignatius Zakka I Iwas, Patriarch of Antioch and All the East in a ceremony held in Damascus, Syria.

Childhood
He was born in the Cheruvillil family of Vadayambadi in Puthencruz to Mathai and Kunjamma on 22 July 1929. 
Early part of the life of Mor Baselios Thomas I was of sufferings. Though he belonged to an aristocratic family, by the time he was born the family had seen bad days. As a child he had frequent bouts of illness which affected his education. His mother used to take the young boy frequently to the nearby Malekurishu Dayro where the relics of late Patriarch St. Elias III had been interred.

Priesthood
His priestly formation was under the guidance of Mor Philoxenos Paulos (later Catholicos Baselios Paulose II) who ordained him korooyo in 1952 and mshamshono at Kadamatom Church in 1957. In 1958, he was ordained priest by Mor Yulius Elias Qoro in September 1958 at Manjinikkara. He is the 43rd priest from the Cheruvillil family. C.M. Thomas served as the vicar of St. Peter's church, Puthencruz from 1959 while also serving churches at Mookkannur, Vellathooval, Keezhumuri, St. Peter's & St. Paul's Orthodox Church - Fort Cochin, Valamboor and later at Calcutta and Trichur. In 1960, while vicar at Puthenkurish, he played a key role in rebuilding the church; parishioners fondly recollect their priest working with them during the reconstruction. From 1967 to 1974, he served as the organizing secretary of Kolenchery Medical Mission Hospital. In 1970, he served as the organizer for the North Indian mission at Bhilai and in 1974 as the secretary of the Pourasthaya Suvishesha Samajam. Since his ordination as korooyo, at age 24, Thomas was active in preaching the gospel in the remote parts of Kerala. From his vision and zeal to spread the gospel arose the St. Paul's prayer fellowship and the Puthencruz gospel convention which is held annually from 26 to 31 December.

Episcopacy

Fr C.M. Thomas was elected to the episcopate by the Malankara Jacobite Syrian Christian Association meeting at Karingachira St. George Church in January 1974 and was consecrated, under the name of 'Mor Dionysius', metropolitan of the Angamali Diocese, the largest Syriac Orthodox diocese, by Mor Ignatius Ya`qub III on 24 February 1974 at Damascus along with Geevarghese Mor Gregorios (Perumpally Thirumeni). The two metropolitans played a significant role in leading the church during the crisis of the seventies. After the passing away of Mor Gregorios Geevarghese in February 1999, Mor Dionysius assumed the Presidency of the Malankara Syrian Orthodox Church Synod and was elected Catholicos-Designate at the delegates meeting held at Puthenkurishu on 27 December 2000 and again by the Jacobite Syrian Christian Association constituted under the newly formed constitution on 6 June 2002.

Catholicate of India

The office of the Maphrian/Catholicose of India had been vacant from 1996 (date of death of Baselios Paulose II) to 2002. On 26 July 2002, Mor Dionysius was consecrated Catholicos of India by name Baselios Thomas I in a ritual officiated by Syriac Orthodox Patriarch Moran Mor Ignatius Zakka I Iwas of Antioch and All the East and Supreme Head of the Syriac Orthodox Church, at Maarat Saidnaya, Damascus. As the head of the Jacobite Church in India the Catholicos presides over the Holy Episcopal Synod of Malankara Church which includes all the Metropolitans of the Syrian Orthodox Church in India. He was also the Metropolitan Trustee of the Jacobite Syrian Christian Church.

In 2019, he has relinquished his administrative duties and resigned as "Metropolitan Trustee" position and will remain as Catholicos of India. Past 90 years, the Catholicos had offered to step down from both positions, but Patriarch of the Universal Syriac Orthodox Church Ignatius Aphrem II had asked him to continue as Catholicos.

In August 2019, Gregorios Joseph, Metropolitan of the Kochi diocese of the Jacobite Syrian Orthodox Church, was unanimously elected metropolitan trustee of the Church at a meeting of the Jacobite Syrian Christian Association at the Patriarchal Centre, Puthencruz near Kochi, which is also the headquarters of the Syriac Orthodox Church in India. There were "no other candidates" for the position. The Catholicate office of Mor Baselios Thomas I functions and resides at the "Mor Ignatius Zakka I Centre" also known as Patriarchal Centre.

Intensifying the protest against the takeover of the many Jacobite churches, the Jacobite faction of the Malankara Church headed by Catholicos Baselios Thomas I and metropolitan trustee Gregorios Joseph has launched a sit-in satyagraha in Kochi and further protests. Protests centered around St. Mary's Church, Piravom and spreading to St. Thomas Church (Marthoma Cheriyapally) in Kothamangalam subject to handing over their churches and properties to the Orthodox faction affiliated with the Malankara Orthodox Syrian Church as per the Supreme Court verdict of July 2017.

References

External links
 The Official News Portal of Catholicos Aboon Mor Baselios Thomas I
 The Official Blogs of Catholicos Aboon Mor Baselios Thomas I
 The Official Facebook Page of Catholicos Aboon Mor Baselios Thomas I
 Biography of H.B. Catholicose Baselios Thomas I
 Catholicos Aboon Mor Baselios Thomas I
 Catholicose
 Faithful will manage churches: Catholicos Baselios Thomas I

1929 births
Living people
Jacobite Syrian Christian Church
Syriac Orthodox Church bishops
People from Ernakulam district
Indian Oriental Orthodox Christians